Terňa is a village in the Prešov District of the Prešov Region in eastern Slovakia.

History
The first reference to Terňa in historical literature appears in 1259 when Béla IV of Hungary donated Terňa to a Šariš royal named Therne.

Geography

Population 
The village has a population of 1,335 people (2020-12-31).

References

Villages and municipalities in Prešov District
Šariš